Manasthan is a 2004 Indian Tamil-language romantic drama film directed by K.Bharathi. The film stars Sarathkumar and Sakshi Shivanand. Abbas, Vijayakumar and Sujatha play supporting roles. It was released on 11 June 2004.

Plot 
A rich landlord Ramasamy and his wife Lakshmi have two sons Deva and Selva. Deva is an illiterate village bumpkin who is naive and is devoted to his family, gives a job to Pachakili who makes fun. Selva is a college student. Raasathi is Deva's cousin and love interest, and was betrothed to marry him since childhood. Deva's family has a rivalry with Ramasamy's younger brother's family.

All is well until Deva's maternal grandmother becomes severely ill. She meets with Ramasamy on her deathbed and reveals a secret: Deva is not their Child. During her delivery,  Lakshmi's son was born dead. As a result, Lakshmi's mother switched her dead son with an infant Deva, whom she found abandoned in a train latrine. This causes Ramasamy to kick out deva from his home and disown him, as Ramasamy is a staunch castist. This causes the rich Deva to become a pauper, but he loves his parents more than ever.

Meanwhile, Rasathi's brother arranges her wedding with Deva's cousin, but she consumes poison and blackmails her family that she will die unless Deva marries her. Deva marries her takes her to the hospital, but she dies on the way, devastating Deva. Shortly after her funeral, Selva comes back home and heavily criticizes Ramasamy for mistreating Deva. He leaves home to find Deva and reunites with him. Later on, Ramasamy and Selva are kidnapped by Deva's cousins and are blackmailed to sign over their properties. Deva comes and rescues them. Ramasamy and entire village beg Deva to return, and take his place as Ramasamy's heir. However, Deva refuses and leaves forever in a train latrine while everyone tries to look for him.

Cast 

Sarathkumar as Deivarasu
Sakshi Shivanand as Raasathi
Abbas as Selvarasu
Vadivelu as Pachakili
Mansoor Ali Khan
Vijayakumar as Pattamaniyar
Sujatha as Pattamaniyar's wife
Kaka Radhakrishnan
Sukumari
Shanthi Williams
Rajesh
Bonda Mani
Dhamu
Vaiyapuri
Chaplin Balu

Soundtrack 
Soundtrack was composed by S. A. Rajkumar and lyrics were written by Pa. Vijay, Nandalala and Kalaikumar.

Reception 
Indiaglitz wrote "Debutant director Bharathi has tried to come out with a movie on father-son relationship, targetting the family audience. When fast-paced scripts are the order of the day in Tamil filmdom, the narration seems slow in Manasthan." Sify wrote "Manasthan is as stale as day before yesterday?s sambarand can be avoided." Visual Dasan of Kalki wrote that a fan who ignores Manasthan, where there is no innovation in anything be it cinematography, music or direction, is really a knowledgable.

References

External links 
 

2000s Tamil-language films
2004 films
Films scored by S. A. Rajkumar